Herbert Kennedy Andrews FRCO (10 August 1904 – 10 October 1965) was a composer and organist based in the East Riding of Yorkshire, and Oxford.

Life

He was the son of Arthur Macdonald Andrews and Sarah Black, born in Comber, County Down and educated at Bedford School.

He gained two doctorates in music, one from New College, Oxford, and another from Trinity College, Dublin. He gained his Fellowship of the Royal College of Organists in July 1935.

He was a lecturer in music at New College, Oxford and Balliol College, Oxford, and also at the Royal College of Music.

On 10 October 1965, Dr Andrews died whilst playing for the inaugural and dedication service of the new Harrison & Harrison organ of Trinity College, Oxford, having been consultant for the project.

Appointments

Organist at Beverley Minster, 1933 – 1938
Organist at New College, Oxford, 1938 – 1956

Compositions

He wrote:
A Magnificat and Nunc Dimittis in D.
A Magnificat and Nunc Dimittis in G.
Ah See the Fair Chivalry Come
A Glass of Beer
He Wants Not Friends
The Spacious Firmament on High (Joseph Addison)
When cats run home

References

1904 births
1965 deaths
English organists
British male organists
Alumni of New College, Oxford
Alumni of Trinity College Dublin
People from Comber
Fellows of the Royal College of Organists
People educated at Bedford School
20th-century classical musicians
20th-century English composers
20th-century organists
20th-century British male musicians
20th-century British musicians